Lyman Law (August 19, 1770 – February 3, 1842), son of Richard Law and father of John Law, was a United States representative from Connecticut.  He was born New London, Connecticut. He pursued classical studies and was graduated from Yale College in 1791. He studied law and was admitted to the bar in 1793 and commenced practice in New London.

Law was a member of the Connecticut State House of Representatives in 1801, 1802, 1806, 1809, 1810, 1819, and 1826, and served as speaker in 1806, 1809, and 1810. He was elected as a Federalist to the Twelfth, Thirteenth, and Fourteenth Congresses (March 4, 1811 – March 3, 1817). Law was the sixth Grand Master of the Masonic Grand Lodge of Connecticut, serving from 1821 to 1822.

He died in New London on February 3, 1842, and was originally buried in the "Second Burial Ground" and was reburied in Cedar Grove Cemetery in 1851.

His son John Law served as United States Representative from Indiana.  His son William Henry Law was a member of the Connecticut General Assembly.

References

1770 births
1842 deaths
Politicians from New London, Connecticut
Speakers of the Connecticut House of Representatives
Yale College alumni
Federalist Party members of the United States House of Representatives from Connecticut
American Freemasons